A list of films produced by the Bollywood film industry based in Mumbai in 1983:

Top-grossing films
The top five grossing films at the Indian Box Office in 
1983:

1983 A-Z

References

External links
 Bollywood films of 1983 at the Internet Movie Database
 Indian Film Songs from the Year 1983 - A look back at the year 1983 with a focus on the Hindi film song
Listen to songs from Bollywood films of 1983

1983
Lists of 1983 films by country or language
Films, Bollywood